Myurella is a genus of sea snails, marine gastropod molluscs in the subfamily Terebrinae of the family Terebridae, the auger snails.

Species
Species within the genus Myurella include:
 Myurella affinis (Gray, 1834)
 Myurella amoena (Deshayes, 1859)
 Myurella andamanica (Melvill & Sykes, 1898)
 † Myurella basterotii (Nyst, 1845) 
 Myurella bilineata (Sprague, 2004)
 Myurella brunneobandata (Malcolm & Terryn, 2012)
 Myurella burchi (Bratcher & Cernohorsky, 1982)
 Myurella conspersa (Hinds, 1844)
 Myurella dedonderi (Terryn, 2003)
 Myurella eburnea (Hinds, 1844)
 Myurella flavofasciata (Pilsbry, 1921)
 Myurella fortunei (Deshayes, 1857)
 Myurellopsis guphilae (Poppe, Tagaro & Terryn, 2009)
 Myurella joelbartschi (Poppe, Tagaro & Goto, 2018)
 Myurella mactanensis (Bratcher & Cernohorsky, 1982)
 Myurella mauricejayi Terryn, Gori & Rosado, 2019
 Myurella mindanaoensis (Aubry, 2008)
 Myurella multistriata (Schepman, 1913)
 Myurella nebulosa (G.B. Sowerby I, 1825)
 Myurella ningaloensis (Aubry, 1999)
 Myurella pertusa (Born, 1778)
 † Myurella peyrehoradensis (Peyrot, 1931) 
 Myurella picardali (Aubry, 2011)
 Myurella pseudofortunei (Aubry, 2008)
 Myurella pygmaea (Hinds, 1844)
 Myurella reunionensis (Bratcher & Cernohorsky, 1985)
 Myurella russoi (Aubry, 1991)
 Myurella suduirauti (Terryn & Conde, 2004)
 Myurella wellsilviae (Aubry, 1994)

Species brought into synonymy
 Myurella albocincta Carpenter, 1857: synonym of Terebra armillata Hinds, 1844
 Myurella belcheri E.A. Smith, 1873: synonym of Terebra guayaquilensis (E.A. Smith, 1880)
 Myurella capensis E.A. Smith, 1873: synonym of Euterebra capensis (E.A. Smith, 1873)
 Myurella cinctella (Deshayes, 1859): synonym of Maculauger cinctellus (Deshayes, 1859)
 Myurella columellaris (Hinds, 1844): synonym of Myurellopsis columellaris (Hinds, 1844)
 Myurella contracta E.A. Smith, 1873: synonym of Terebra contracta (E.A. Smith, 1873)
 Myurella duplicatoides Bartsch, 1923: synonym of Duplicaria duplicata (Linnaeus, 1758)
 Myurella exiguoides (Schepman, 1913): synonym of Punctoterebra exiguoides (Schepman, 1913)
 Myurella fijiensis E.A. Smith, 1873: synonym of Terebra fijiensis E.A. Smith, 1873
 Myurella granulosa E.A. Smith, 1873: synonym of Pristiterebra pustulosa (E.A. Smith, 1879)
 Myurella guayaquilensis E.A. Smith, 1880: synonym of Terebra guayaquilensis (E.A. Smith, 1880)
 Myurella hindsii Carpenter, 1857: synonym of Terebra intertincta Hinds, 1844
 Myurella hiscocki (Sprague, 2004): synonym of Profunditerebra hiscocki (Sprague, 2004)
 Myurella joserosadoi (Bozzetti 2001): synonym of Myurellopsis joserosadoi (Bozzetti, 2001)
 Myurella kilburni (Burch, 1965): synonym of Myurellopsis kilburni (R. D. Burch, 1965)
 Myurella lineaperlata Terryn & Holford, 2008: synonym of Punctoterebra lineaperlata (Terryn & Holford, 2008) (original combination)
 Myurella macgillivrayi E.A. Smith, 1873: synonym of Punctoterebra textilis (Hinds, 1844)
 Myurella minipulchra Bozzetti, 2008: synonym of Hastulopsis minipulchra (Bozzetti, 2008)
 Myurella miranda E.A. Smith, 1873: synonym of Pristiterebra miranda (E.A. Smith, 1873)
 Myurella monicae (Terryn, 2005): synonym of Myurellopsis monicae (Terryn, 2005)
 Myurella myuros (Lamarck, 1822): synonym of Cinguloterebra commaculata (Gmelin, 1791)
 Myurella nathaliae (Drivas & Jay, 1988): synonym of Myurellopsis nathaliae (Drivas & Jay, 1988)
 Myurella okudai Poppe, Tagaro & Goto, 2018 : synonym of Profunditerebra okudai (Poppe, Tagaro & Goto, 2018)
 Myurella orientalis (Aubry, 1999): synonym of Profunditerebra orientalis (Aubry, 1999)
 Myurella parkinsoni (Cernohorsky & Bratcher, 1976): synonym of Myurellopsis parkinsoni (Bratcher & Cernohorsky, 1976)
 Myurella paucistrata E.A. Smith, 1873: synonym of Myurella paucistriata E.A. Smith, 1873
 Myurella paucistriata E.A. Smith, 1873: synonym of Myurellopsis paucistriata (E. A. Smith, 1873)
 Myurella pumilio E.A. Smith, 1873: synonym of Euterebra tantilla (E.A. Smith, 1873)
 Myurella rosacea (Pease, 1869): synonym of Punctoterebra rosacea (Pease, 1869)
 Myurella rufocinerea Carpenter, 1857: synonym of Terebra intertincta Hinds, 1844
 Myurella simplex Carpenter, 1865: synonym of Terebra hemphilli Vanatta, 1924
 Myurella solangeae Bozzetti, 2015 : synonym of Punctoterebra solangeae (Bozzetti, 2015)
 Myurella stearnsii (Pilsbry, 1891): synonym of Cinguloterebra stearnsii (Pilsbry, 1891)
 Myurella tantilla E.A. Smith, 1873: synonym of Euterebra tantilla (E.A. Smith, 1873)
 Myurella turrita E.A. Smith, 1873: synonym of Hastulopsis turrita (E.A. Smith, 1873)
 Myurella undulata (Gray, 1834): synonym of Myurellopsis undulata (Gray, 1834)

References

 Terryn Y. (2007). Terebridae: A Collectors Guide. Conchbooks & NaturalArt. 59pp + plates

External links
 Fedosov, A. E.; Malcolm, G.; Terryn, Y.; Gorson, J.; Modica, M. V.; Holford, M.; Puillandre, N. (2020). Phylogenetic classification of the family Terebridae (Neogastropoda: Conoidea). Journal of Molluscan Studies

Terebridae
Gastropod genera